Spaceship Earth is a world view term usually expressing concern over the use of limited resources available on Earth.

Spaceship Earth may also refer to:
 Spaceship Earth (detector), a network of neutron monitors designed to measure the flux of cosmic rays arriving at Earth from different directions
 Spaceship Earth (Epcot), an attraction at the Epcot theme park in Walt Disney World Resort, Florida, USA
 Spaceship Earth (film), a 2020 documentary about Biosphere 2
 Spaceship Earth (sculpture), at Kennesaw State University, Kennesaw, Georgia, USA
 Spaceship Earth (Tous sur orbite !), a 52 episode documentary created during the 1990s
 Spaceship Earth, a 1966 book by Barbara Ward